Blondel may refer to:

 Apostilb, an old unit of luminance
 Blondel (surname)
 Blondel de Nesle (c. 1155 – 1202), French trouvère, or poet
 Jean-François Blondel (1683–1756), French architect  
 Maurice Blondel (1861–1949), French philosopher  
 Vincent Blondel (born 1965), Belgian applied mathematician  
 Amazing Blondel, an English progressive folk band
 Blondel (album), a 1973 album by the band
 Blondel (musical), a rock opera

See also
 Blondell, a surname and given name
 Blondeau, a French surname
 Blondin (disambiguation)